Renzo Patria (10 November 1933 – 8 June 2019) was an Italian politician. He was member of the Christian Democracy party.

References

1933 births
2019 deaths
Italian politicians
People from Frugarolo